Gennady Chertishchev (born 1932) is a Soviet alpine skier. He competed in two events at the 1956 Winter Olympics.

References

1932 births
Living people
Soviet male alpine skiers
Olympic alpine skiers of the Soviet Union
Alpine skiers at the 1956 Winter Olympics
People from Sverdlovsk